Ole Lemmeke (born 10 January 1959 in Copenhagen) is a Danish actor. He is known for his work in Besat, Magnetisøren's femte vinter and Den russiske sangerinde.

As of 2012, he was playing the role of Herman Bang in Bang and Betty at the Folketeatret (People's Theatre) in Denmark.

References

1959 births
Male actors from Copenhagen
Danish male stage actors
Danish male film actors
Best Actor Bodil Award winners
Living people
Best Actor Robert Award winners